Gaġġa (Cage) is a 1971 film adaptation of the 1971 novel Il-Gagga written by Frans Sammut. The adaptation was written and directed by Mario Azzopardi, who was a film student at the time. The film was originally made as a thesis, but was released in 2007 due to its cultural importance, being the first feature film made with a script entirely in Maltese.

Plot

External links

1971 films
Films based on Maltese novels
Films directed by Mario Philip Azzopardi
Maltese drama films
Maltese-language films

References